Sphenoraia nebulosa is a species of skeletonizing leaf beetle in the family Chrysomelidae, found in Indomalaya and eastern Asia.

References

External links

 

Galerucinae
Beetles of Asia
Beetles described in 1808
Taxa named by Leonard Gyllenhaal